La Feria North is a census-designated place (CDP) in Cameron County, Texas, United States. The population was 212 at the 2010 census. It is part of the Brownsville–Harlingen Metropolitan Statistical Area.

Geography
La Feria North is located in western Cameron County at  (26.179752, -97.825158). It is bordered to the south by the city of La Feria.

Demographics
As of the census of 2000, there were 168 people, 47 households, and 39 families residing in the CDP. The population density was 144.0 people per square mile (55.4/km2). There were 50 housing units at an average density of 42.9/sq mi (16.5/km2). The racial makeup of the CDP was 70.83% White, 0.60% African American, 2.98% Asian, 23.81% from other races, and 1.79% from two or more races. Hispanic or Latino of any race were 76.19% of the population.

There were 47 households, out of which 48.9% had children under the age of 18 living with them, 63.8% were married couples living together, 17.0% had a female householder with no husband present, and 14.9% were non-families. 10.6% of all households were made up of individuals, and 4.3% had someone living alone who was 65 years of age or older. The average household size was 3.57 and the average family size was 3.93.

In the CDP, the population was spread out, with 38.1% under the age of 18, 12.5% from 18 to 24, 17.3% from 25 to 44, 22.6% from 45 to 64, and 9.5% who were 65 years of age or older. The median age was 24 years. For every 100 females, there were 88.8 males. For every 100 females age 18 and over, there were 92.6 males.

The median income for a household in the CDP was $61,250, and the median income for a family was $62,604. Males had a median income of $24,250 versus $11,875 for females. The per capita income for the CDP was $12,010. About 37.2% of families and 41.6% of the population were below the poverty line, including 77.3% of those under the age of eighteen and none of those 65 or over.

Education
La Feria North is served by the La Feria Independent School District.

In addition, South Texas Independent School District operates magnet schools that serve the community.

References

Census-designated places in Cameron County, Texas
Census-designated places in Texas